Frederick Haymes (5 April 1849 – 12 March 1928) was an Australian cricketer. He played two first-class matches for Tasmania between 1870 and 1873.

See also
 List of Tasmanian representative cricketers

References

External links
 

1849 births
1928 deaths
Australian cricketers
Tasmania cricketers
Cricketers from Launceston, Tasmania